In the state of Washington, the common law felony murder rule is codified at Revised Code of Washington §§ 9A.32.030(c) and 9A.32.050(b).

First degree felony murder
First degree felony murder is defined as a homicide committed by a participant against someone other than another participant, who is committing or attempting to commit (including during immediate flight from the crime) one of the following crimes: 
(1) robbery in the first or second degree, 
(2) rape in the first or second degree, 
(3) burglary in the first degree, 
(4) arson in the first or second degree, or 
(5) kidnapping in the first or second degree.

Second degree felony murder
Second degree felony murder committed in the course of a felony not listed under first degree felony murder and in furtherance of such crime and causes the death of a person other than one of the participants.

See also
 Law of Washington (state)
 Felony murder rule#United States

References

U.S. state criminal law
Washington (state) law